Neil Lowe (born ) is a former Scotland international rugby league footballer who played in the 1990s, 2000s and 2010s.

Background
Lowe was born in Leeds, West Yorkshire, England.

Playing career
He was named in the Scotland training squad for the 2008 Rugby League World Cup.

He was named in the Scotland squad for the 2008 Rugby League World Cup.

First Division Grand Final appearances
Neil Lowe played right-, i.e. number 12, in Featherstone Rovers' 22–24 defeat by Wakefield Trinity in the 1998 First Division Grand Final at McAlpine Stadium, Huddersfield on 26 September 1998.

References

External links
 (archived by web.archive.org) Keighley Cougars profile
 (archived by archive.is) Keighley Cougars profile
 (archived by web.archive.org) RLWC08 profile
Statistics at rugbyleagueproject.org
Search for "Neil Lowe" at bbc.co.uk

1978 births
Living people
Doncaster R.L.F.C. players
English people of Scottish descent
Featherstone Rovers players
Hunslet R.L.F.C. players
Keighley Cougars players
Salford Red Devils players
Scotland national rugby league team captains
Scotland national rugby league team players
Rugby league players from Leeds
York City Knights players
Rugby league second-rows